Laura Ruohonen (born October 9, 1960, in Helsinki, Finland) is a Finnish playwright and theatre director. She works also as Professor of Dramaturgy in Theatre Academy of Finland.

Some works
Olga (1995, Finnish National Theatre)
The Greatest of These is Love (Suurin on rakkaus, 1998, Finnish National Theatre)
The Swamp Man Never Sleeps (Suomies ei nuku, 2000, KOM-teatteri)
An Island Far From Here (Saari kaukana täältä, 2003, Royal National Theatre)
Razorbill (Yksinen, 2006, Teatteri Jurkka)
War Tourists (Sotaturistit, 2008, Finnish National Theatre)

External links
 Nordic Drama Corner

Finnish dramatists and playwrights
Finnish women dramatists and playwrights
Finnish theatre directors
Women theatre directors
1960 births
Living people